Bosiliack is a small farming hamlet in the civil parish of Madron, Cornwall, UK. The hamlet is located between Madron and Morvah.

The hamlet contains several places of interest including Bosiliack Barrow, a Neolithic burial chamber; Ding Dong Mine, one of the oldest mines in the UK; and Carfury Standing Stone.

References

External links
 http://www.megalithic.co.uk/article.php?sid=6922
 https://www.google.co.uk/maps/@50.1422394,-5.5865728,3a,16.6y,359.6h,84.64t/data=!3m6!1e1!3m4!1sepYGk9GnLSkU751VTxdlVA!2e0!7i13312!8i6656
 https://www.google.co.uk/maps/@50.1571509,-5.5885616,16.42z

Hamlets in Cornwall